Mount Buffalo is a mountain plateau of the Australian Alps and is within the Mount Buffalo National Park in Victoria, Australia. It is noted for its dramatic scenery.

The summit of the highest peak of the plateau, known as The Horn, has an elevation of  AHD.

Mount Buffalo is managed by Parks Victoria.

History
Before European settlement, Mount Buffalo was visited by the Mitambuta and Taungurung people who visited to feast on Bogong moths (Agrotis infusa). Hamilton Hume and William Hovell were the first Europeans to visit the area and they named the mountain during their 1824 expedition, noting the mountain's  resemblance to a giant, sleeping buffalo.

In 1836, the explorer and Surveyor General of New South Wales, Thomas Mitchell visited the area and named the mountain Mount Aberdeen, unaware it had already been named Mount Buffalo.

Recreation
There are extensive walking tracks across the Plateau that is studded with large granite tors.  The Mount Buffalo Gorge has sheer granite cliffs that provide good views down to the Ovens Valley.  The cliffs are popular for rock climbing.  There is a launch ramp for hang gliders at the cliffs.

There are waterfalls on the edge of escarpment.

The Mount Buffalo Chalet provided accommodation on the mountain but is not currently operating.

During winter Mount Buffalo offers snow play and cross-country skiing.

Lake Catani on the plateau is used for canoeing, fishing and swimming.

Climate

An extreme winter rainfall peak is noted, with a large quantity falling as heavy snow.

See also

 List of mountains in Victoria
 Buffalo River (Victoria)
 Mount Buffalo National Park

References 

Mountains of Victoria (Australia)
Ski areas and resorts in Victoria (Australia)
Climbing areas of Australia
Forests of Victoria (Australia)
Victorian Alps
Mountains of Hume (region)